Country Girl is the third  studio album by the South African singer-songwriter Zahara, released on September 22, 2015. It features a guest appearance from Robbie Malinga.

The album was certified gold on the day of its release and later went triple platinum.

Commercial performance 
The album was certified gold within 24 hours of its release, platinum within two weeks and later went triple platinum, selling 140,000 copies.

Accolades 
At the 22nd ceremony of South African Music Awards Country Girl won the award for Best Produced Album and also nominated for Best Afro Album at South African Afro Music Awards in 2017.

|-
|rowspan="3"|2016
|rowspan="4"|Country Girl
|Best Produced Album 
|
|-
|Female Artist of the Year
|
|-
|Best R&B/Soul/Reggae Album    
|
|-
|2017
| Best Afro Album
|

Tracklisting

Personnel 
All credits adapted from AllMusic.
 Zahara - vocals, composer
 Linda Gcwensa - composer
 Stefan Myburgh - composer
 Robbie Malinga - featured artist (track 5), composer 
 Pamela Myburgh - composer

Release history

References 

2015 albums
Zahara (South African musician) albums
Xhosa-language albums